Mu Ko Lanta National Park is a national park in the southern part of Krabi Province, Thailand, consisting of several islands.  The two largest islands are Ko Lanta Noi and Ko Lanta Yai. Although both are inhabited, Ko Lanta Yai is the primary tourist destination. The park was established on 15 August 1990 

A clan of Chao Ley, or "sea gypsies" lives on Ko Lanta Yai. The clan still practices many of their ancient customs and ceremonies, such as the setting of ceremonial boats adrift to bring good luck and prosperity on the full moon nights of the sixth and eleventh months.

Toponymy
Ko Lanta was once known by its Malay name, "Pulao Satak", which means "Long Beach Island". Later, many Thais, both Buddhist and Muslim, moved to the island making the island known as the island of "a million eyes" ("lan ta" in Thai). The name may also be derived from the Javanese "lan-tas", or fish grill (built of wood with a square grill on top where the fish are placed in a circle).

Topography
The area of Mu Ko Lanta National Park is 83,750 rai ~ . It includes Mu Ko Rok, Ko Mai Ngam, Ko Talabeng, Ko Lanta Yai, Ko Ngai, Mu Ko Rokk, Ko Rok Nai, Mu Ko Maa, Ko Hin Dang and the nearby islands of Ko Klang, Ko Lanta Noi, and Ko Lanta Yai sub-district, Amphoe Ko Lanta, Krabi Province.

The terrain is mountainous, especially near the southern tip. Plains are found only in beach areas in the southern portion of the park. Most areas have more than a 35 degree slope, except only the middle part of island where the slope is more than 50 degrees. Elevations range from sea level to 488 meters at the tallest peak.

Climate 
Highest rainfall is in September, 391.4 mm, and lowest in January at 6.5 mm. September has the most rainy days with 21.6 days and February the fewest, about 1.6 days. During the rainy season, 16 May-31 October, some smaller islands are closed to visitors.

Fauna 
The animals that live on the islands are divided into six categories.

1. Mammals: bats (deer, tigers and barking deer used to live on the islands).

2. Birds: brahminy kite, bridled tern, and emerald dove.

3. Reptiles: asian water monitor, reticulated python, and cobras.

4. Amphibians: giant mountain frogs, ornate froglets, and common tree frog.

5. Freshwater fish and marine fish: blue danio fish, coral reef fish, and lizard fish.

6. Coral reef animals: staghorn coral, Fungia fungites, and anemone coral.

Flora 
The plants in Mu Ko Lanta National Park can be categorized into three groups.

1. Rainforest: The total area of rainforest at Mu Ko Lanta Yai is about 19.42 km2. The average height of trees is 15–25 meters. The important plants are Hopea ferrea, Dipterocarpus turbinatus and Lagerstroemia floribunda.

2. Mangrove forest: On Ko Ngu, Ko Mai Ngam, and Ko Mai Ngam Tai. The average height of trees is five meters. There are many plants in the mangrove forest, such as Avicennia alba, Rhizophora apiculata, and Rhizophora mucronata.

3. Beach forest: Found on Ko Ngai between the beach and rainforest. Significant plants are bengal almond, Millettia pinnata, and beach morning glory.

Gallery

See also
 List of national parks of Thailand
List of Protected Areas Regional Offices of Thailand

References

National parks of Thailand
Protected areas established in 1990
Geography of Krabi province
Tourist attractions in Krabi province
1990 establishments in Thailand